Theodor "Todde" Malm (23 October 1889 – 2 October 1950) was a Swedish amateur footballer and bandy player. He competed in the 1908 Summer Olympics and in the 1912 Summer Olympics. In the 1908 tournament he was a part of the Swedish football team and played in the only match for Sweden. Four years later he was a member of the Swedish Olympic squad. He did not play in a match, but was a reserve player.

References

External links
Profile at Sveriges Olympiska Kommitté

1889 births
1950 deaths
Association football fullbacks
Swedish footballers
Swedish bandy players
Sweden international footballers
AIK Fotboll players
AIK Bandy players
Olympic footballers of Sweden
Footballers at the 1908 Summer Olympics
Footballers at the 1912 Summer Olympics
Footballers from Stockholm